Gelert's Farm Halt railway station on the Welsh Highland Heritage Railway is a railway station in Wales that was opened in 1988. It is a simple platform alongside the main shed at Gelert's Farm Works.

All trains in one direction stop at the halt for the passengers to visit the museum. The halt is a request stop for trains in the other direction. Until the end of 2005 trains stopped in the Pen-y-Mount (up) direction. From the 2006 season, trains stop in the Porthmadog (down) direction. The platform was rebuilt and extended in 2006. In early 2007, the platform was extended a further  in the northerly direction and a ramp constructed to enter the North Yard. A water supply has been installed at the southern end of the platform for watering locomotives.

External links
Welsh Highland Heritage Railway website

Heritage railway stations in Gwynedd
Welsh Highland Railway
Porthmadog
Railway stations built for UK heritage railways